The Fridtjof Nansen-class frigates are a class of frigates that are the main surface combatant units of the Royal Norwegian Navy. The ships are named after famous Norwegian explorers, with the lead ship of the class bearing the name of Fridtjof Nansen, the Norwegian scientist, explorer and humanitarian. Five ships were ordered from Spanish shipbuilder Bazan (now Navantia).

As of November 2018, four are in active service and one has sunk and was subsequently scrapped.

Design
The frigates were originally intended as a replacement for the aging s, with a primary focus on anti-submarine warfare (ASW). Eventually, the need for a robust anti-aircraft defense as well as the possibility of incorporating the Naval Strike Missile surface-to-surface missile produced by Norwegian company Kongsberg Defence & Aerospace led to a more multi-role design. The selection of Navantia as prime contractor led to the design being very similar to the Spanish Navy's s, including the incorporation of Lockheed Martin's AEGIS combat system.

Improvements
The Fridtjof Nansen-class frigates are larger, and have more personnel and equipment than the Oslo-class frigates. Compared to the Oslo-class vessels, the new vessels are 35 meters longer, nine meters taller and two meters deeper below water. They are also five meters broader and have three times the water displacement of the old ships. The frigates operated six NFH NH90 helicopters, with the role as an extended "arm" of the frigates' ASW and ASuW capabilities but these will be taken out of services (2022) and returned to NH Industries.

Service history
On 26 February 2009, the Norwegian government decided to deploy Fridtjof Nansen to the Gulf of Aden, thereby participating in the ongoing Operation Atalanta, the European Union's counter-piracy campaign in Somalia. Fridtjof Nansen joined the campaign in August 2009.

Fridtjof Nansens engagement in Operation Atalanta was carried out without a permanently stationed helicopter. Mainly due to delays in delivery of the new NH-90, the ship was equipped with two fast RHIBs for its onboard contingent of maritime special operations forces (Marinejegerkommandoen).

In November 2009 she became involved in a firefight with suspected pirates after being attacked while inspecting a fishing vessel.

In December 2013 HNoMS Helge Ingstad and the Danish  support ship  were sent to the Syrian port of Latakia to escort the Norwegian registered RoRo cargo ship  and the Danish cargo ship , which transported Syrian chemical weapons to Italy where they were handed over to a United States Navy ship for destruction in international waters.

On 8 November 2018, while returning from participation in Exercise Trident Juncture, Helge Ingstad was involved in a collision with a Maltese-registered oil tanker, Sola TS, that severely damaged the frigate and caused a severe list that placed it in serious danger of sinking in spite of its position. The frigate was successfully beached to prevent it sinking and allow the crew to be evacuated. In the early hours of 13 November the vessel partially sank with only smaller sections of the superstructure remaining above water. The vessel was recovered but with the cost of repair prohibitive it has been decommissioned and was scrapped.

Ships in class
The ships are named after explorers Fridtjof Nansen, Roald Amundsen, Otto Sverdrup, Helge Ingstad and Thor Heyerdahl.

Images

See also
 Aegis Combat System
 List of naval ship classes in service
 List of active Royal Norwegian Navy ships

Notes

References

External links

 Official Royal Norwegian Navy website on the class 
 Official Royal Norwegian Navy website on the class 
 Lockheedmartin:Spy-1F makes waves during debut, makes the furthest ESSM intercept ever, outstanding sea skimmer detection
 Norway order Sting Ray mod 1 torpedo for frigates
 Sea Protector remote weapon systems ordered (March 2009) for Nansen frigates
 Norway ordering the AN/SSQ-62E DICASS sonobuoy acoustic emissions detection system (Jan 2010)
 http://www.defpro.com/news/details/18513/ - Reutech radar installed aboard Norwegian frigate (Oct 2010)

Frigates of Norway
Frigate
Frigate classes